Michael Tooley (born 1941) is an American philosopher, now emeritus at the University of Colorado, Boulder, best known for his contributions to metaphysics.

Education and career

He has a BA from the University of Toronto and earned his Ph.D. in philosophy at Princeton University in 1968. He taught at Stanford University and the Australian National University and since 1992 at the University of Colorado Boulder.

Philosophical work

Tooley has worked on philosophy of science, philosophy of religion, causality and metaphysical naturalism, and has debated the existence of God with William Lane Craig. His early paper "Abortion and Infanticide", arguing that there is no moral difference between them and that both are permissible, has been controversial.

See also
 Growing block universe

Bibliography
 The Problem of Evil (Elements in the Philosophy of Religion) (Cambridge: Cambridge University Press, 2019)
 Abortion – Three Perspectives (Oxford: Oxford University Press, 2009)
 Knowledge of God (with Alvin Plantinga, Oxford: Blackwell Publishing, 2008)
 Metaphysics (New York: Garland Publishing, 1999). In five volumes: Volume 1 - Laws of Nature, Causation, and Supervenience; Volume 2 - The Nature of Time; Volume 3 - Properties; Volume 4 - Particulars, Actuality, and Identity; Volume 5 - Necessity and Possibility.
 Time, Tense, and Causation (Oxford: Oxford University Press, 1997)
 Causation (Oxford: Oxford University Press, Readings in Philosophy Series, 1993). Co-edited with Ernest Sosa.
 Causation: A Realist Approach (Oxford: Oxford University Press, 1987)
 Abortion and Infanticide (Oxford, 1985 [1983])

References

External links
 

Living people
21st-century American philosophers
20th-century American philosophers
Philosophers of science
Metaphysicians
Philosophy academics
Princeton University alumni
University of Toronto alumni
Analytic philosophers
Place of birth missing (living people)
University of Colorado Boulder faculty
Academic staff of the University of Western Australia
Academic staff of the Australian National University
American atheists
1941 births